Walt Disney World Speedway was a racing facility located on the grounds of the Walt Disney World Resort in Bay Lake, Florida, near Orlando.

It was built in 1995 by IMS Events, Inc., a subsidiary of the Indianapolis Motor Speedway Corporation, and was designed primarily as a venue for the Indy 200 at Walt Disney World, an Indy Racing League event.

The circuit's primary use was as a venue for the Richard Petty Driving Experience, and the Indy Racing Experience, programs that allow fans to drive or ride in real race cars. After the 2000 racing season, it was no longer used as a track for major motorsports racing series, but was used by many racing teams from IndyCar to NASCAR as a test venue due to the warmer climate than other tracks around the United States during the off season for racing. However, the track closed permanently on August 9, 2015.

AutoWeek magazine and the Orlando Sentinel dubbed the track "The Mickyard" (a portmanteau of the Disney icon Mickey Mouse and Indianapolis Motor Speedway's nickname, the "Brickyard").

History

The track was a three-turn tri-oval, designed by Indianapolis Motor Speedway chief engineer Kevin Forbes, and the location was chosen in September 1994 by Greg Ruse of Buena Vista Construction. The track was situated on a triangular plot of land adjacent to the Magic Kingdom's parking lot near Disney's Polynesian Resort. Plans for the track were first announced on January 23, 1995. The track was designed to fit within the boundaries of the existing infrastructure, requiring minimal rerouting of existing roads.

On June 27, 1995, Indianapolis Motor Speedway Chairman of the Board Mari Hulman George took part in a groundbreaking ceremony. She presented the track with one of the original paving bricks from the famous "Brickyard." Despite 1995 having the wettest June–July in Orlando on record (75 inches of rain), including Hurricane Erin, the construction was completed on-time, with final paving completed October 18, 1995.

The track was dedicated on November 28, 1995. Indy Racing League drivers Arie Luyendyk, Eddie Cheever, Eliseo Salazar, Lyn St. James and Davey Hamilton drove a five-car "Flying V" formation amongst fireworks. Initial testing at the facility for the Indy Racing League took place November 27–December 9, 1995.

The race track hosted its first car race, a Formula Ford 2000 support race on January 26, 1996, followed the next day with the Indy Racing League's Indy 200 car race. On February 7, 1997, the first racing experience program, the Richard Petty Driving Experience, opened at the Speedway.

Closure and demolition
On March 27, 2015, it was announced that the speedway would close on August 9, 2015, and be razed. Demolition began late August to make way for "transportation improvements", namely expanding and reconfiguring the Magic Kingdom parking lot and parking entrance.

Design
Walt Disney World Speedway was constructed on a very limited budget. By design, permanent features of the facility were built at a minimum. The track plans called for only the track surface, retaining wall, and catch fence to be constructed. The remainder of the facility, such as seating areas, restrooms, and race support areas would be built on a temporary, as-needed basis. This strategy had never been used on an oval race track, but had been widely successful for years in temporary street circuits (such as Long Beach). No permanent garages were built on the premises, but this was not entirely unusual. Race teams would simply work out of their transporters, a practice used frequently at street circuits and other tracks without garages.

The initial savings in construction costs was significant. Temporary bleachers and restroom facilities would be erected each year beginning in November, in preparations for the races in January. The lack of permanent grandstands also allowed track officials to adjust the configuration and capacity of seating annually reflecting ticket demand. This practice, however, would prove to be inconvenient and increasingly expensive in the long run since the grandstand area encompassed a portion of the Magic Kingdom parking lot. That area of the lot would be unusable for nearly three months, including during the busy Christmas and New Year's holiday season at the theme park.

Three linked ponds in the track's infield are formed in the shape of Mickey Mouse. The pond, dubbed "Lake Mickey", was built a year after the track opened due to drainage concerns.

Parking problems
Initially, the track location, which was adjacent to the Magic Kingdom parking lot, was seen to be convenient. However, after a couple of years, traffic control on race days became overwhelming. Because race spectators would arrive at the same time and place as regular Magic Kingdom theme park guests, overflow parking was required. In 1996–1997, Disney officials reacted by parking all race spectators in the Magic Kingdom parking lot, and diverting all Magic Kingdom guests to the Epcot parking lot. Race spectators would walk to the nearby Speedway, while all guests to the Magic Kingdom were required to take the monorail or a bus from Epcot to the Transportation and Ticket Center. There, they would transfer to a monorail on the Magic Kingdom loop, a somewhat circuitous trip which resulted in numerous guest complaints. In 1997, the IRL race was shortened by a sudden rainstorm, causing fans to hurry to their cars and resulting in severe traffic gridlock on World Drive and surrounding roads which lasted for several hours.

Starting in 1998, race spectators were diverted to park at Epcot, and were taken by shuttle bus to the Speedway while guests to the Magic Kingdom were directed to park, as usual, in the Magic Kingdom parking lot. While this eased many theme park guest complaints, it was now inconvenient for race spectators as it necessitated them to arrive earlier to account for the additional travel time. It additionally resulted in a significant cost increase in race operations, as the Disney Transport bus fleet was not big enough to accommodate the race shuttle operation. As a result, outside bus companies had to be hired to run the race shuttle service.

End of professional racing

In its first few years of operation, the track was used frequently as a year-round test facility, due to the warm winter weather in Orlando. However, the track suffered three major accidents. During a week of preseason testing, on January 11, 1997, IRL driver Eliseo Salazar crashed in turn one. He suffered a fracture of his lower back, and missed two races. Two weeks later, on January 23, 1997, IRL driver Davy Jones broke his neck after a practice crash in turn three. On January 6, 2000, IRL driver Sam Schmidt was paralyzed after a crash in preseason testing. The track was built before the SAFER barrier was introduced, which many feel may have lessened the injuries in all three cases.

After the 2000 IRL season, series officials and Walt Disney World were not able to come to an agreement for a race date for 2001. IRL officials were dissatisfied with the January date, as it was seen to be too early for most teams to be prepared for the season. There was typically a six-week gap until the second race of the season. Disney officials also were concerned with the impending conflict with Super Bowl XXXV, to be held in Tampa presumably the same weekend. Initial talks planned to move the race date to Labor Day weekend, and ultimately to a new facility to be built near U.S. 192. The NASCAR Craftsman Truck Series had already declined to renew its contract with the Speedway for similar reasons after 1998. The talks quietly ceased between the IRL and Disney, and the race was not scheduled for 2001. It was ultimately removed from the IRL schedule permanently. That same year, the IRL added Homestead, and in 2005 added St. Petersburg, which helped fill the void in Florida.

Richard Petty Driving Experience / Indy Racing Experience / Exotic Driving Experience
During the off-season in 1997, the track began hosting the Richard Petty Driving Experience, a stock car-based racing organization that allowed the general public to drive real NASCAR machines, or ride along with a professional driver and served as the track's primary function, year-round. It was the only track used by the RPDE that, weather permitting, operated roughly 365 days a year. To assist in the increased ingress and egress, a one-lane automobile tunnel was built for the 1997 season. In the summer of 1999, a new visitor's center and gift shop was built to permanently house operations for RPDE. A new modest garage facility was built for them also. The operation had previously worked out of trailers and tents, without significant utilities.

On November 13, 2008, it was announced that the track would be shared with the Indy Racing Experience, a similar program to RPDE. The IndyCar two-seater machine would be used for fan ride-alongs, and Indy cars would also be available to be driven by fans. After appearing at various tracks on a largely irregular schedule, the Indy Racing Experience made the track its permanent year-round home.

On January 16, 2012, a new driving experience started business at Walt Disney World Speedway geared towards high end "supercars" called the Exotic Driving Experience. Modifications were made to the speedway's infield to create an "Exotics Course" which was a one-mile layout that ran clockwise and combined part of the oval with a street-style course.

Other uses
On February 19–20, 1999, the track hosted the 7th Annual SunDay Challenge Alternative Energy Vehicle Rally. The highlight of the meet featured the Formula Lightning teams of Ohio State, Kettering, and FAMU/FSU. The event was covered by Central Florida News 13.
The series debuted later that season.
The oval was part of the course of the Walt Disney World Marathon in some years.

Track records

Indy Racing League

Unofficial all-time track record: Buddy Lazier, 19.450 seconds; 185.089 mph (January 13, 1996)

Lap Records
The official race lap records at Walt Disney World Speedway are listed as:

Past race results

Indy Racing League
The Indy Racing League IndyCar Series Indy 200 was the first event held at the track. The 1996 running marked the first race conducted by the IRL, and the original intent for the facility.

1997: Race shortened due to rain.
1999: Race scheduled for and held on a Sunday.

NASCAR Craftsman Truck Series
The Chevy Trucks Challenge was a NASCAR Craftsman Truck Series event held at the track from 1997–1998. It served as the season opening event of both years. The race was discontinued after 1998 due to the wide gap (10 weeks) it created until the second event of the season.

1998: Race extended due to a green–white–checker finish.

USAC Formula Ford 2000
The Formula Ford Walt Disney World Challenge was a 50-lap,  race for the USAC Formula Ford 2000 series. It was held as a support race to the Indy Racing League event for the first three years of operation.

1996  Sam Schmidt
1997  Urubatan Helou Jr.
1998  David Besnard

USAC Silver Crown Series
The Silver Bullet 50 was a 50-lap,  race for the USAC Silver Crown Series. During its first running, it was held in support to the NASCAR Craftsman Truck Series race. For 1999–2000, it was held as a support race to the Indy Racing League event.

1998  Brian Tyler
1999  Mike Bliss
2000  Brian Tyler

Incidents

From 1995 to 2015, the track experienced one fatal accident. On April 12, 2015, driving instructor Gary Terry, 36, was fatally injured after a crash during a run as part of the Exotic Driving Experience. Terry was riding in the passenger seat of a Lamborghini Gallardo LP570-4 Superleggera, when the driver lost control and crashed into a metal guardrail. Terry died at the scene while the driver, identified as 24-year-old Tavon Watson, was transported to the hospital with minor injuries. Florida Highway Patrol investigated and announced that, while the decision to run vehicles clockwise (instead of counterclockwise as the track was designed for) may have been a factor in the incident, it was an accident and no charges were filed against the driver since it was on private property.

References

External links

Richard Petty Driving Experience at Walt Disney World Speedway
Official Page
www.indy200.com at Internet Archive Wayback Machine
Exotic Driving Experience

Motorsport venues in Florida
IndyCar Series tracks
NASCAR tracks
Tourist attractions in Orange County, Florida
Walt Disney World
1995 establishments in Florida
Recurring sporting events established in 1996
Recurring sporting events disestablished in 2000
2015 disestablishments in Florida
Tourist attractions in Greater Orlando
Sports venues in Orlando, Florida
Tourist attractions in Orlando, Florida
Defunct motorsport venues in the United States
Sports venues completed in 1995
Sports venues demolished in 2015
Former Walt Disney Parks and Resorts attractions